Endicott College is a private college in Beverly, Massachusetts.

History 
Endicott College was founded as Endicott Junior College in 1939 by Eleanor Tupper and her husband, George O. Bierkoe. Originally a two-year women’s college, its mission was educating women for greater independence and an enhanced position in the workplace. The school was named for John Endicott, an early overseer of Harvard University and the first governor of the Massachusetts Bay Colony. It was issued its first charter by the Commonwealth of Massachusetts that same year. It graduated its first class, 20 students, in 1941. In 1944, the school was approved by the state for the granting of associate degrees, and in 1952, Endicott was accredited by the New England Association of Schools and Colleges. In 1975, the college dropped the 'Junior' from its name, becoming just Endicott College. In 1994, Endicott became co-educational.

George Bierkoe served as Endicott’s first president from its opening until 1971. Eleanor Tupper then served as president until 1980. She subsequently wrote Endicott and I, published in 1985, which details the founding and history of the college. Carol Hawkes became the third president of Endicott College in 1980, and during her tenure the college transitioned from a two-year to a four-year institution. Francis Gamelin served as Endicott's fourth president as the college searched for Hawkes' successor. In 1988, Richard E. Wylie became Endicott's fifth president. Wylie’s 30-year tenure was marked by major growth; the college built more than 20 new buildings and expanded its footprint to 235 acres of land alongside Beverly’s scenic coast. Wylie died in May 2018. Dr. Kathleen Hildreth Barnes stepped in as interim president while Endicott's board engaged in a search for the college's next president. On March 27, 2019, Endicott announced that Steven R. DiSalvo, Ph.D. would become its seventh president. Dr. DiSalvo was inaugurated on September 27, 2019.

Endicott's campus includes many historic buildings. On June 6, 1939, Endicott College purchased its first building, an estate known today as Reynolds Hall, which has served as a residence hall since the college opened on September 17, 1939. In 1940, Endicott College purchased two more buildings: Alhambra and College Hall. Both structures were a part of the William Amory Gardner estates. Built in 1750 by Thomas Woodbury, Alhambra is the oldest building on Endicott’s campus, and prior to its purchase, was used as a summer home by Isabella Stewart Gardner (until 1906). Since its purchase by the college, it has been used as student housing. College Hall, built in 1916, was designed as a summer home by Henry Richards and subsequently purchased by Endicott in 1940. The building currently houses multiple administrative offices, including the Office of the President.In 1943 Endicott purchased the 1904 home of Bryce and Anna Allan, designed and built by architect Guy Lowell, and later named it Tupper Manor after the second president of the college. Today, the property is a part of the Wylie Inn and Conference Center. Winthrop Hall, built in 1845, was purchased by Endicott in 1944. In the 19th century, Winthrop's hidden stairway aided slaves en route to Canada via the Underground Railroad, and during World War II, the property was used by the United States Coast Guard as a coastline security facility. After it was purchased by the college, Winthrop became home to Endicott’s first president. Today, the building is used as student housing.

In 2010, Endicott purchased the property known as Beechwood to serve as the trustee center and home of the school's president. The building was designed by Boston architect Ogden Codman, Jr. in 1900. Originally, it was designed as a summer estate for members of the prominent Ames family of Easton, Massachusetts.

Currently, there are nearly 3,000 undergraduate students, over 2,500 students enrolled in the School of Graduate & Professional Studies, hundreds of students are studying abroad, and more than 25,000 alumni worldwide.

Campus 

The college campus is located on  oceanfront property on the North Shore of Massachusetts Bay, in an area known as the Gold Coast. This area includes two beaches, Tupper Beach and Brindle Beach, frequented by the campus community.

Endicott's main academic buildings include the Samuel C. Wax Academic Center, Curtis L. Gerrish School of Business & Ginger Judge Science Center, Walter J. Manninen Center for the Arts, Center for Nursing, and Van Loan School of Graduate & Professional Studies. The Diane M. Halle Library serves as the main library on campus and also houses additional classrooms and student support services.

The Callahan Center is the main student activities building on campus and houses the main dining hall, as well as a number of student services.

The Post Sport Science & Fitness Center was opened in 2009 and is the main center for the School of Sport Science & Fitness Studies. The building includes a gymnasium, a field house with an indoor track, workout facilities, aerobics and dance rooms, and classrooms.

The Manninen Center for the Arts opened in 2009 and houses the School of Visual and Performing Arts. The facility includes a number of spaces for performances and exhibitions, including the 250-seat Rose Theater and a 100-seat black box theater.

The Raymond J. Bourque Ice Arena houses the college's NCAA Division III men’s and women’s ice hockey programs, as well as serve as home to Beverly Youth Hockey, Beverly High School Hockey, and other local sports activities.

Endicott currently houses all on-campus students in a variety of residence halls, from large dormitory-style arrangements to smaller apartment-style housing. Some residence halls serve particular populations, including a healthy-living dorm and women-only dorms, or offer themed programming. Many historic buildings are used as residence halls, including Reynolds Hall, Alahambra Hall, Winthrop Hall, Kennedy Hall, and Hamilton Hall. The latter was built in the late 1800s and by the Cotting family, whose members founded the Cotting School in 1893, and later owned by Herbert Sears Tuckerman. The college has also announced plans to build a new 300 bed residence hall in 2015.

Endicott College is listed as one of the haunted colleges in the book Haunted Colleges and Universities in Massachusetts by Renee Mallet. The school was also mentioned in the book Haunted Halls by Elizabeth Tucker. There are many ghost stories that students share about the dorms that they live in and some are thought to be true. Old maps of Beverly call Endicott’s surrounding areas as the "Witch’s Woods," as it was rumored to be a place where many escaped to after being accused in the Salem Witch Trials by hiding in the forests.

The campus has been host to the Misselwood Concours d'Elegance, an antique automobile show, since 2010. The event is one of only two such car shows in New England.

In 2012 and 2013, Endicott was named to The Boston Globe's "Top Places to Work" list.

Endicott College has an academic site in Boston, 18 instructional locations throughout New England, and international sites in Czech Republic, Spain, and Switzerland.

Academics 
Endicott College has undergraduate and graduate-level programs. For undergraduate degrees, Endicott offers 6 Associate degree programs, 36 Bachelor programs, 21 concentrations, and 45 minors. The college also has 40 Master's degree programs, and 4 Doctorate programs. Between the undergraduate and graduate-level programs, Endicott offers 13 certificate programs.

Endicott College is composed of the School of Arts & Sciences, Gerrish School of Business, School of Communication, School of Education, School of Hospitality Management, School of Sport Science & Fitness Studies, School of Nursing, School of Visual & Performing Arts, and the Van Loan School of Graduate & Professional Studies. Graduate programs are offered in Business, Education, Nursing, Computer Science, and Political Science. The most popular major is Business Management, followed by Fitness and Recreation Studies, Psychology and Visual/Performing Arts.

In 2014, the college initiated its first doctoral program (Ed.D.) in Educational Leadership in Higher Education, and currently also offers an Ed.D. in PreK-12 Educational Leadership, a Ph.D. in Applied Behavioral Analysis, and a Ph.D. in Nursing.

Endicott's student-to-faculty ratio is 12:1.

All bachelor's degree candidates must complete three distinct internship experiences before graduation, including two 120-hour positions and a semester-long internship during their senior year. Students majoring in nursing and athletic training earn internship credits with clinical educational experiences while education majors gain experience in the classroom through student teaching.

In 2013, of the 3,675 students that applied to the college, 42% were admitted. Of these students, 59% were female and approximately 52% were from out-of-state. The average GPA of admitted freshman was 3.23, in which a quarter of the students ranked in the top 10% of their graduating class. Over 86% of Endicott students receive some form of financial aid, and the average financial aid package is about $20,065.

Endicott was ranked no. 23 in the Regional Universities (North) category of U.S. News & World Reports 2019 rankings.

Student life

Endicott offers over 60 student organizations, numerous academic honor societies, and varsity, club, and intramural sports. Many students also choose to participate in national community service organizations, including Habitat for Humanity, or volunteer in the local community. The student newspaper, the Endicott Observer, publishes an array of news and feature stories about the Endicott College community.

 Athletics 
Endicott College teams participate as a member of the NCAA Division III. The Gulls are a member of the Commonwealth Coast Conference (CCC). In football, Endicott competes in Commonwealth Coast Football, a football-only league operated by the CCC but technically separate from it. Endicott was formerly a member of the Great Northeast Athletic Conference (GNAC). Men's sports include baseball, basketball, cross country, equestrian, football, golf, lacrosse, soccer, tennis and volleyball, while women's sports include basketball, cross country, equestrian, field hockey, lacrosse, soccer, softball, tennis and volleyball.

Club Sports

Endicott offers 8 men’s and women’s club sports: Cheerleading, Crew, Dance, Men’s and Women’s Ice Hockey, Men’s and Women’s Rugby, and Sailing. In 2015, Men’s Ice Hockey became a Division III sport as a member of the Eastern Collegiate Athletic Conference (ECAC).

Intramural Athletics

Throughout the 2013-2014 academic year, 1,400 students participated in intramural sports on campus. These sports include flag football (men's), powderpuff football (women's), outdoor soccer (men's & women's), 3-on-3 basketball (men's & women's), floor hockey (men's & women's), volleyball (co-ed),  5-on-5 basketball (men's & women's), arena football (men's & women's), indoor soccer (men's & women's), kickball (co-ed), and softball (co-ed).

Accomplishments
{| class="wikitable"
|-
! | Sport
! | Men’s/Women’s
! | Conference
! | ConferenceChampionships
! | NCAATournamentAppearances
|-
|Baseball
|Men's
|CCC
|7
|6
|-
|Basketball
|Men's
|CCC, GNAC
|6
|5
|-
|Field Hockey
|Women's
|CCC
|2
|2
|-
|Football
|Men's
|CCC Football
|2
|2
|-
|Golf
|Men's
|CCC
|5
|1
|-
|Lacrosse
|Men's
|CCC
|7
|8
|-
|Lacrosse
|Women's
|CCC
|9
|9
|-
|Soccer
|Men's
|CCC, GNAC
|2
|1
|-
| | Soccer
| | Women’s
| | CCC, GNAC
| | 10
| | 10
|-
| | Softball
| | Women’s
| | CCC, GNAC, NEWAC
| | 13
| | 10
|-
| | Tennis
| | Women’s
| | CCC
| | 4
| | 4
|-
|Volleyball
|Men's
|NECVA, NECC
|4
|2
|-
| | Volleyball
| | Women’s
| | CCC
| | 4
| | 4
|}Facilities'

 The outdoor facilities include the Cross Country Course, Hempstead Stadium, North Field, Softball field, and Tennis Courts, Winter Island. Hempstead Stadium was built in 2003, and this turf surface is home to football, men and women’s lacrosse, rugby, and men and women’s soccer programs here at Endicott. The Stadium was originally named Endicott Stadium, but was formally dedicated to Melissa Hempstead '69 on Saturday, October 3, 2015 on Homecoming Weekend. Endicott’s baseball and field hockey teams use North Field, and all teams practice on this turf surface as well. Indoor facilities include the Post Center, MacDonald Gymnasium, and Spring Tide Farms. The MacDonald Gymnasium was built in 1999 and is home to both basketball and volleyball teams.

Notable alumni

References

External links 

 
 Official athletics website
 Endicott College Historic Campus Architecture Project, The Council of Independent Colleges

 
Educational institutions established in 1939
Private universities and colleges in Massachusetts
Universities and colleges in Beverly, Massachusetts
1939 establishments in Massachusetts